Likhni Church “Aba-Ata” is a church in the village of Lykhny, Gudauta Municipality, Autonomous Republic of Abkhazia, Georgia. 

The church was built in the High Middle Ages. The church walls are in a heavy physical condition and need an urgent conservation.
The church was awarded the category of a real cultural monument of national importance on November 7, 2006, by a decree of the President of Georgia.

References

External links 
Likhni Church “Aba-Ata Historical monuments of Abkhazia — Government of the Autonomous Republic of Abkhazia.

Churches in Abkhazia
Immovable Cultural Monuments of National Significance of Georgia